Argyle High School is a public high school located in the city of Argyle, Texas. The high school opened up in 2002 and is now classified as a 5A school by the UIL. It is a part of the Argyle Independent School District located in south central Denton County. In 2016, the school was rated "Met Standard" by the Texas Education Agency.

The boundary of the school district, and therefore that of the high school, includes the majority of Argyle and portions of Bartonville, Denton, Flower Mound, and Northlake.

Athletics
Argyle's athletics compete in UIL class 5A. The main athletic venue is Eagle Stadium which can seat 5,000 spectators. In less than two decades of existence, Argyle has seen success in multiple sports with multiple state championships including a designation as national champions in Baseball.

Sports
Argyle Eagles compete in these sports:

Baseball
Basketball
Cross country
Football 
Golf
Powerlifting
Soccer
Softball
Tennis
Track and field
Volleyball
Wrestling
Bass Fishing
Freestyle Rapping

State Titles
Baseball 
2015(4A), 2018(4A), 2019(4A)
Boys Basketball 
2012(3A), 2021(4A)
Girls Basketball 
2006(3A), 2012(3A), 2015(4A), 2016(4A), 2017(4A), 2018(4A), 2019(4A)
Boys Cross Country 
2007(3A), 2008(3A), 2009(3A)
Football 
2013(3A/D2), 2020 (4A/D1)
Boys Golf 
2015(4A), 2021(4A)
Girls Golf
2021(4A)
Volleyball 
2015(4A)
Marching Band
2003(2A), 2005(2A), 2008(3A), 2010(3A), 2012(3A), 2014(4A), 2020(4A), 2021(4A) 
The Argyle High School Marching Band has more state titles than any other school in the state of Texas with 8 titles as of 2021
UIL Lone Star Cup Champions 
2006(2A), 2009(3A), 2012(3A), 2013(3A), 2014(3A), 2015(4A), 2016(4A), 2017(4A), 2018(4A), 2019(4A), 2020(4A)

Academics
UIL State Academic Meet Champions 
2004(2A), 2006(2A), 2008(3A), 2009(3A), 2010(3A), 2011(3A), 2012(3A), 2013(3A), 2014(3A), 2015(4A), 2016(4A), 2017(4A), 2018(4A)

Band
State Marching Band Champions 
2003(2A), 2005(2A), 2008(3A), 2010(3A), 2012(3A), 2014(4A), 2020(4A), 2021(4A)
State Honor Band Winners 
2006(2A), 2009(3A), 2020(4A), 2021(4A)

Choir
UIL Sweepstakes Awards 
2018(4A), 2019(4A)

References

External links
 Argyle ISD website

Public high schools in Texas
High schools in Denton County, Texas
2002 establishments in Texas
Educational institutions established in 2002